Alfred Frederick Maynard (23 March 1894 – ) was an English rugby union player.  He was the son of William Maynard, former international association footballer.  He won 3 caps as a hooker in the 1914 Five Nations Championship.  He was killed at Beaumont Hamel in the First World War when serving as a lieutenant in the Royal Naval Division and is commemorated on the Thiepval Memorial.

References

1894 births
1916 deaths
British military personnel killed in the Battle of the Somme
English rugby union players
England international rugby union players
Rugby union hookers
Royal Navy officers of World War I
63rd (Royal Naval) Division soldiers